Rowing at the 1964 Summer Olympics featured seven events, for men only.

Medal summary

Men's events

Participating nations

A total of 370 rowers from 27 nations competed at the Tokio Games:

Medal table

References

External links
 International Olympic Committee medal database

 
1964 Summer Olympics events
1964
Summer Olympics